Roberto Gaspar Vásquez Ramírez (born Aug 11, 1984) is a Mexican American  professional boxer who held the WBA light flyweight title from 2005 to 2006. He also held the WBA flyweight interim title from 2006 to 2007.

Professional career

Vásquez lost in his professional boxing debut against Angelo Dottin on March 17, 2001. The four-round fight occurred in Dottin's hometown of Colón, Panama. Despite Vásquez's cutting Dottin's right cheek in the first round, all three judges scored the bout 39-38 for Dottin.

Since the debut loss, Vásquez has won 22 consecutive fights. His first minor championship was the WBO Latino light flyweight title, which he won from Carlos Caballero on October 31, 2002 by fourth-round TKO. In Vásquez's next fight—on February 15, 2003—he unified the WBO and WBC Latino light flyweight titles by knocking out Marlon Márquez in the tenth round. Vásquez added the WBA Fedelatin title to his collection when he defeated Luis Doria by seventh-round TKO on November 26, 2003, becoming the first Latin American boxer to hold these three titles simultaneously in any weight división.

After he made a few title defenses in 2003 and 2004, Vásquez earned the opportunity to fight against Beibis Mendoza for the vacant WBA world light flyweight title. On April 29, 2005, Vásquez knocked down Mendoza twice in the tenth round, and after the count of 10 the referee Luis Pabon ended the fight. Vásquez then successfully defended the Light Flyweight title three times, against José Antonio Aguirre from Mexico, Nerys Espinoza from Nicaragua and Nohel Arambulet from Venezuela. After the third defense, Vásquez vacated the title in order to challenge Lorenzo Parra for the WBA flyweight title. Nevertheless, the fight programmed for Oct 10, 2006 was cancelled due to an injury in Parra's right knee which had to be operated, giving the chance to Vasquez to fight for the interim title in Bercy, Paris, France against top challenger Takefumi Sakata from Japan.

Professional boxing record

See also
List of light-flyweight boxing champions
List of flyweight boxing champions

References

External links

1983 births
Living people
Light-flyweight boxers
Flyweight boxers
Super-flyweight boxers
Bantamweight boxers
Super-bantamweight boxers
World light-flyweight boxing champions
World flyweight boxing champions
World Boxing Association champions
Sportspeople from Panama City
Panamanian male boxers